Rear Admiral Alec Tyndale-Biscoe OBE (10 August 1906 – 26 April 1997) was a distinguished naval engineer and a senior officer in the British Royal Navy.

He played a leading role in the design of the biggest and last battleship to be built for the Royal Navy, HMS Vanguard.   Some years later, when a UK-based auto manufacturer wished to name a new model as Standard Vanguard, Tyndale-Biscoe was involved in the decision as to whether they should be permitted to do so.

Biography
Alec Julian Tyndale-Biscoe was born at North Petherton (Bridgwater, Somerset) in the southwest of England, the elder of the two recorded sons of Lt. Col. Arthur Annesley Tyndale-Biscoe (1872–1969) by his marriage two years earlier to Emily Beatrice Duff (1883–1976). Tyndale-Biscoe was a great grandson of Captain George Duff (1764–1805), through his mother's family.

He was educated at the Royal Naval Colleges, Osborne and Dartmouth and entered the British Royal Navy in 1920. Specialising as a naval engineer, he served in the navy during and after the Second World War, rising to the rank of captain in 1949 and ending his professional career as a "rear admiral".

Between February 1939 and April 1940 he was employed at the onshore facility identified as "HMS President" with the "Admiralty Department of the Director Aircraft Maintenance and Repair facility".   For nearly three years, till February 1943, he was then based near Southampton at "HMS Daedalus", another shore based facility.   During this period there were several promotions, apparently within the naval engineering staff department.

References

Royal Navy rear admirals
1906 births
1997 deaths
Officers of the Order of the British Empire
Royal Navy personnel of World War II